Big O Speedway (formerly 85 Speedway) is a 1/4 mile, semi-banked, clay oval dirt track located east of Ennis, Texas.

References 

Buildings and structures in Ellis County, Texas
Motorsport venues in Texas
Tourist attractions in Ellis County, Texas